Gheorghe Georgescu (born 15 July 1911; date of death unknown) was a Romanian footballer who played as a forward. He scored a hat-trick in the 6–5 victory against Ripensia Timișoara in the 1934–35 Cupa României final, which helped Rapid București win the first trophy in the club's history.

International career
Gheorghe Georgescu played three games at international level for Romania, including two games at the 1935 Balkan Cup. He scored one goal in a friendly which ended with a 7–1 loss against Sweden.

Honours
Rapid București
Cupa României: 1934–35, 1936–37, 1938–39

References

External links
Gheorghe Georgescu at Labtof.ro

1911 births
Romanian footballers
Romania international footballers
Association football forwards
Liga I players
FC Rapid București players
AS CFR Brașov players
Year of death missing